Rugby in Estonia may refer to:

Rugby league in Estonia
Rugby union in Estonia